John Grayton Dolphin (April 9, 1902 – February 1, 1958), also known as Lovin John, was an American businessman, independent record label owner, concert promoter and music producer, who established Dolphin's of Hollywood, an influential record store that remained open 24 hours a day.  Dolphin was one of the first and most well respected and successful black businessmen and independent record label owners, whose contributions to the music industry, jazz, R&B, and the formative years of rock and roll have often been overlooked.

Early life
Dolphin was born in the Southern town of Beatrice, Alabama in 1902 to Lewis (Stallworth) Dolphin and Elyce Dolphin.  He left Beatrice at a very young age and moved to Boley, Oklahoma, where he was raised.  He later moved to Detroit, Michigan and finally settled in Los Angeles, California.

Career

Dolphin's of Hollywood

His record store Dolphin's Of Hollywood was opened in 1948 on Central Avenue in Los Angeles. Central Ave was a hub for jazz music in Los Angeles and attracted figures such as Duke Ellington, Nat King Cole, Jelly Roll Morton, Louis Armstrong, Lionel Hampton, Joe Turner, Billie Holiday, Sam Cooke and Charlie Parker.  Dolphin's of Hollywood was a prime factor in the emergence of rhythm & blues music on the West Coast by its sales of records and as being the location of landmark R&B radio broadcasts by Hunter Hancock and Dick "Huggie Boy" Hugg.  Hits like "Earth Angel (Will You Be Mine)", by the doo-wop group The Penguins, were first released during a live broadcast inside Dolphins of Hollywood.  To get an audience reaction, John Dolphin asked Huggy Boy to play both sides of the record over the air.  Dolphin's of Hollywood record store featured live DJs, and a radio show broadcasting live over local station KRKD from inside the store's walls. Dolphin's of Hollywood soon became one of the most famous records shop in America. Recording artist appeared at the store and performed live on-air interviews as well as greet and sign autographs for customers. Dolphin's also offered "Buy One Get One Free" for purchases of any record in the store. The name Dolphin's of Hollywood arose from the fact that Hollywood wouldn't allow blacks to own or operate any business in Hollywood, so this was Dolphin's way of bringing Hollywood to South Central Los Angeles, as he was quoted saying "If blacks can't go to Hollywood, I'll bring Hollywood to blacks."
Rudy Ray Moore aka Dolemite got his start in the music business recording for John Dolphin's Cash Records label under the group name Rudy Ray Moore & The Rayettes. Eventually Moore went on to become Dolphin's assistant helping to run his record label and everyday activities of the busy store. While working at the world-famous Dolphin's of Hollywood record store, Moore's songs were often playing on their own radio station, but this period of employment would give way to a significant change in his career. A wino named Rico would often come into the store requesting money for soup. Moore would give him money if he would perform a toast called "Dolemite." Toasts are a black tradition of story telling, often the "tallest" tale being the best. Rudy was amazed at how much the people enjoyed this routine and decided to modify it and use it professionally in his act. This single bit of material has become his namesake.  On Saturday nights around about midnight there would be 500 plus people all outside dancing in the streets in front of the Dolphin's of Hollywood record shop.

Work as record producer
With his very own live radio show and recording studio in the back of the Dolphin's of Hollywood record shop, Dolphin was a serious attraction for music artist. Dolphin's motto was "We'll record you today and have you a hit by tonight", his marketing genius would serve him well because artist knew with John Dolphin they would get the exposure they needed in order to become successful and on his radio show he could instruct the DJs to play the records his labels produced. In 1950 Dolphin started his first label, Recorded In Hollywood (RIH).  His first chart success came in 1951, "Once There Lived A Fool", by Duke Ellington's vocalist Jimmy Grissom.  The song, penned by Jessie Mae Robinson, became the subject of almost a dozen covers, by Tony Bennett, Charles Brown, Tommy Edwards, Savannah Churchill, John Greer, Jimmy Witherspoon and others.  He worked on other National hit songs such as "Buzz-Buzz-Buzz", by the Hollywood Flames, "The Jerk" by The Larks, and "Make me Yours" by Betty Swann.  His contributions to music spans from Jazz to Rock'n'Roll.  He worked with artists such as Sam Cooke, Jesse Belvin, Charles Mingus, Pee Wee Crayton, Major Lance, Scatman Crothers, Harry Caesar, Tony Allen, Gene Forrest, Percy Mayfield, Damita Jo, Marvin Phillips, Jesse Belvin, Illinois Jacquet and Linda Hayes.  Dolphin produced several famous records under the Recorded In Hollywood label, and eventually created other labels like Lucky Records, Cash Records, and finally, Money Records.  Dolphin sold Money and its holdings to Don Pierce's Hollywood Records in 1956.

Crossover music
Dolphin brought fame to many underserved, talented, black artists who had been hidden behind the facade of crossover music. The creator and innovator of the crossover music concept, this crossover music concept was essentially taking music originally recorded by African Americans and having white artists re-record it, as during this time, most black music was considered taboo and hard to sell to the masses.  He went on white radio station KRKD and played a black music format, marketing black music to whites. This became what is known in the music industry as to crossover, when a black artist breaks through and begins selling to the much wider white audiences.

Activism
In 1954, Dolphin organized a protest by 150 Black business owners and employees in reaction to an ongoing campaign of intimidation directed at interracial trade.  Dolphin's of Hollywood was outselling other White-owned stores in the city and continued to attract White customers who spent their money not only at the store, but also in the neighborhood.

Death

John Dolphin was murdered behind the desk of his office in Hollywood on February 1, 1958, by frustrated singer and shipping clerk Percy Ivy.  His murder was witnessed by then teenage musicians Bruce Johnston, Sandy Nelson, and Dave Shostac, who were attempting to interest Dolphin in their music.  His wife, Ruth Dolphin, took over Dolphin's of Hollywood after his death.  She died in 2005.

Legacy
In 2015, a musical, Recorded in Hollywood - The Musical, co-written by Dolphin's grandson Jamelle Dolphin, debuted at the Lillian Theatre in Los Angeles. After a very successful first run the following year the musical opened at the larger Kirk Douglas Theatre in Culver City, CA with much of the same success.

On July 28, 2016, city of Los Angeles Councilman Curren D. Price Jr. officially announced and presented the newly renamed intersection of Central Avenue & Vernon Ave to "Dolphin's Of Hollywood Square" in honor and recognition of John Dolphin's groundbreaking contributions to the music industry and the city of Los Angeles.

Books
Recorded In Hollywood: The John Dolphin Story

References

External links
Dolphins of Hollywood History Site
Recorded in Hollywood The Musical Official Site

1902 births
1958 deaths
African-American record producers
Record producers from Alabama
African-American company founders
American company founders
20th-century African-American people